Zyxomma is a genus of dragonfly in the family Libellulidae. 
Species of Zyxomma are small to medium-sized, dully coloured, crepuscular insects. They are known as Duskdarters. Members of Zyxomma are found in India, Japan, Africa and Australia.

Species
The genus Zyxomma includes the following species:

See also
Parazyxomma flavicans  - Banded Duskdarter

References

Libellulidae
Anisoptera genera
Odonata of Asia
Odonata of Australia
Taxa named by Jules Pierre Rambur